The United States Constitution gives the Senate the power to expel any member by a two-thirds vote. This is distinct from the power over impeachment trials and convictions that the Senate has over executive and judicial federal officials: the Senate ruled in 1798 that senators could not be impeached, but only expelled, while debating the impeachment trial of William Blount, who had already been expelled.

Expulsion has not occurred since the Civil War. Censure, a lesser punishment which represents a formal statement of disapproval, has been more common since the start of the 20th century. Although censure carries no formal punishment, only one senator (Benjamin R. Tillman) of the nine to be censured has ever been re-elected. Unlike the House of Representatives, which also disciplines by reprimand, a censure is the weakest form of discipline the Senate issues.

Expelled senators

Expulsion proceedings not resulting in expulsion
Many expulsion proceedings have been begun by the Senate that did not lead to expulsion. In most cases, the expulsion failed to secure the necessary two-thirds vote, in other cases the senator in question resigned while proceedings were taking place, and some proceedings ended when a senator died or his term expired.

Censured senators

See also
List of New York State Legislature members expelled or censured
Censure in the United States
List of federal political scandals in the United States
List of federal political sex scandals in the United States

Federal politicians:
List of United States representatives expelled, censured, or reprimanded
List of American federal politicians convicted of crimes

State and local politics:
List of American state and local politicians convicted of crimes

References

Sources
 

Expelled or censured
 
Federal political sex scandals in the United States